Michael Dunlop Young, Baron Young of Dartington  (9 August 1915 – 14 January 2002), was a British sociologist, social activist and politician who coined the term "meritocracy". He was an urbanist of different dimensions such as academic researcher, polemicist and institution-builder.

During an active life he was instrumental in shaping Labour Party thinking. When secretary of the policy committee of the Labour Party, he was responsible for drafting Let Us Face the Future, Labour's manifesto for the 1945 general election, was a leading protagonist on social reform, and founded or helped found a number of socially useful organisations. These include the Consumers' Association, Which? magazine, the National Consumer Council, the Open University, the Institute for Community Studies, the National Extension College, the Open College of the Arts and Language Line, a telephone-interpreting business.

Early life and education

Young was born in Manchester, the son of (Ernest) Gibson Young, an Australian violinist and music critic; and an Irish Bohemian painter and actress, Edith Hermia Dunlop. According to Michael's son, Toby, Gibson was a "ne'er-do-well", and "the only silver his forebears possessed was what they were able to steal from the gentry".

Until he was eight, Young grew up in Melbourne, returning to England shortly before his parents' marriage broke up. He attended several schools, eventually entering Dartington Hall, a new progressive school in Devon, in the 1920s. He had a long association with the small school, as student, trustee, deputy chairman and historian. He studied economics at the London School of Economics (BScEcon, MA), then became a barrister when he applied to be called to the Bar in 1939.

Young began studying for a PhD at the LSE in 1952. His thesis, dated 1955, was titled A study of the extended family in East London.

Social research and community activism
During the Second World War, Young served as director of the Political and Economic Planning think tank and became director of research for the Labour Party, where he wrote the manifesto for the 1945 general election and the vast speakers' handbook. He served under the Labour government led by Clement Attlee, but left in 1950 saying the party had run out of ideas. He called for the establishment of a Social Science Research Council and became its first director 17 years later.

Young's studies of housing and local government policy in East London, which developed from his doctoral thesis, left him disillusioned with the state of community relations and local Labour councillors. This prompted him to found the Institute of Community Studies, which was his principal vehicle for exploring his ideas of social reform. Its basic tenet was to give people more say in running their lives and institutions.  Butler argues that it  drew upon existing bodies of research in social psychology and sociology to highlight the relevance of the extended family in modern society and to offer a model of socialist citizenship, solidarity and mutual support not tied to productive work. Young promoted the supportive kinship networks of the urban working class, and an idealized conception of the relationships between women, to suggest that family had been overlooked by the left and should be reclaimed as a progressive force. The goal was to strengthen the working-class family as set it up as a model for cooperative socialism.

He also founded the Mutual Aid Centre at this time. Young co-authored (with Peter Willmott) Family and Kinship in East London, documenting and analysing the social costs of rehousing a tight-knit community in a suburban housing estate (known affectionately by sociologists as Fakinel and invariably pronounced with a cockney accent).

In 1958, Young also wrote the influential satire The Rise of the Meritocracy, originally for the Fabian Society, which refused to publish it. In it he coined the word "meritocracy", to which he gave negative connotations, and he became disappointed with how the concept came to be seen as an achievable concept worth pursuing.

Young's social research also contributed to the change in secondary education that led to widespread abolition of grammar schools and their replacement by comprehensive schools between 1965 and 1976, as well as the abolition of the 11-plus.

Although unwilling to maintain a conventional academic career, Young was a fellow of Churchill College, Cambridge, from 1961 to 1966, and president of Birkbeck, University of London, from 1989 to 1992.

Organisational activity
An energetic and resourceful man, Young established many new organisations with the aim of providing "bottom-up" practical help to ordinary citizens. In the 1950s and 1960s he helped to found the Consumers' Association and the National Consumer Council, claiming that "politics will become less and less the politics of production, and more and more the politics of consumption", presenting the ideas in a booklet, The Chipped White Cups Of Dover (1960).

In 1960, he started the Advisory Centre for Education the National Extension College and, with Peter Laslett, a dawn university on Anglia Television, which became prototypes of the Open University which Harold Wilson launched in 1964, building on his vision.

In the mid-1980s, Young co-founded International Alert, together with Leo Kuper and Martin Ennals. Later on that decade, in 1987, he founded the Open College of the Arts, confounding critics who maintained that the arts could not be taught by distance methods. He also founded Language Line, a telephone interpreting business, to enable non-English-speaking people to have equal access to public services. He fostered the work of many younger researchers and "social entrepreneurs", and founded the School for Social Entrepreneurs in 1997. Aspects of Young's work are being developed by the Young Foundation, created from the merger of his Institute of Community Studies and his Mutual Aid Centre, under the direction of Geoff Mulgan.

Throughout his life, and particularly in later life, Young was concerned for older people. In 1982 he co-founded the University of the Third Age with Peter Laslett and Eric Midwinter, and Linkage, bringing together older people without grandchildren and young people without grandparents. In 2001 he co-founded the charity Grandparents Plus to champion the role of the wider family in children's lives.

Later political career
Although he maintained steadfast egalitarian convictions, Young accepted a life peerage on 20 March 1978, taking the Labour whip and the title Baron Young of Dartington, of Dartington in the County of Devon. His many projects required frequent travel to London, and the peerage offered free rail travel and attendance allowance at a time when he had run out of money. 

In 1981, Young defected from Labour to the Social Democratic Party (SDP), and was one of 100 supporters whose names were published alongside the SDP's founding statement, the Limehouse Declaration, in February of that year. Although hitherto largely aloof from the factionalism then devouring Labour, Young's disregard for the statist and trade union-oriented aspects of its post-war social-democratic philosophy (which had led him to advocate the formation of a "Consumers' Party" in The Chipped White Cups of Dover) meant he was receptive to the idea of a new progressive party forming in its stead. Upon joining the SDP, he became a member of the party's policy committee and director of its in-house think tank, The Tawney Society. 

An associate of the SDP's second leader, David Owen, Young refused to back the party's merger with the Liberal Party in 1988 and instead followed Owen into the 'continuing' SDP. A year later, however, he chose to return to Labour following (in Owen's words) that party's "big switch on the EEC, market economics and Trident." Nonetheless, he remained sceptical of Labour's ability to win the next election and believed that it still had to face up to the task of modernising socialism, which had, he said, "lagged so badly since Tony Crosland died."

According to Young's friend Eric Midwinter, "All his thought, all his incisive writing, all his brilliantly conceived schemes, all his astutely handled initiatives were guided by a salient method. He was a utopian socialist. His thinking stemmed from the views of 19th century radicals like Robert Owen, Saint-Simon or Charles Fourier, with their hatred of massive institutionalism, be it in the hands of the public authority or of the large commercial company."

Personal life
Young married three times. In 1945 he married Joan Lawton, with whom he had two sons and a daughter. They divorced and in December 1961 he married Sasha (d. 1993; daughter of Raisley Stewart Moorsom and a descendant of Admiral Sir Robert Moorsom), a novelist, sculptor and painter with whom he had a daughter (who was born before their marriage) and a son, the journalist and writer Toby Young. Young and Moorsom worked together on several projects, including in the townships of South Africa. Moorsom died in 1993 and in 1995 Young married 37-year-old milliner Dorit Uhlemann, with whom he had a daughter Gaia, who died in July 2021 aged 25.

Bibliography
Will the War Make Us Poorer? [with Sir Henry Noel Young] (1943)
Civil Aviation (1944)
The Trial of Adolf Hitler (1944) 
There's Work for All [with Theodor Prager] (1945)
Labour's Plan for Plenty  (1947)
What is a Socialised Industry?  (1947)
Small Man, Big World: A Discussion of Socialist Democracy  (1949)
Fifty Million Unemployed  (1952)
Study of the Extended Family in East London (1955)
Family and Kinship in East London [with Peter Willmott] (1957)
The Rise of the Meritocracy (1958)
Chipped White Cups of Dover: A Discussion of the Possibility of a New Progressive Party (1960)
Family and Class in a London Suburb [with Peter Willmott] (1960)
New Look at Comprehensive Schools [with Michael Armstrong] (1964)
Innovation and Research in Education  (1967)
Forecasting and the Social Sciences [ed.] (1968)
Hornsey Plan: A Role for Neighbourhood Councils in the New Local Government (1971)
Is Equality a Dream? (1972)
Lifeline Telephone Service for the Elderly: An Account of a Pilot Project in Hull [with Peter G. Gregory] (1972)
Learning Begins at Home: A Study of a Junior School and its Parents [with Patrick McGeeney] (1973)
Symmetrical Family: A Study of Work and Leisure in the London Region [with Peter Willmott] (1973)
Mutual Aid in a Selfish Society: A Plea for Strengthening the Co-operative Movement [with Marianne Rigge] (1979)
Building Societies and the Consumer: A Report [with Marianne Rigge] (1981)
Report from Hackney: A Study of an Inner-City Area [with others] (1981)
The Elmhirsts of Dartington: The Creation of an Utopian Community (1982)
Inflation, Unemployment and the Remoralisation of Society (1982)
Up the Hill to Cowley Street: Views of Tawney Members on SDP Policy [ed. with Tony Flower and Peter Hall] (1982)
Revolution from Within: Cooperatives and Cooperation in British Industry [with Marianne Rigge] (1983)
Social Scientist as Innovator (1983)
To Merge or Not to Merge? (1983)
Development of New Growth Areas: Workers' Cooperatives and Their Environment: Comparative Analysis with a View to Job Creation: Support for Worker Cooperatives in the United Kingdom, Republic of Ireland, Netherlands [with Marianne Rigge] (1985)
Metronomic Society: Natural Rhythms and Human Timetables (1988)
Rhythms of society [ed. with Tom Schuller] (1988)
Campaign for Children's After-School Clubs: The Case for Action [with Matthew Owen] (1991)
Life After Work: The Arrival of the Ageless Society [with Tom Schuller, Johnston Birchall and Gwyneth Vernon) (1991)
Governing London [with Jerry White] (1996)
The New East End: Kinship, Race and Conflict [with Geoff Dench and Kate Gavron] (2006)

List of institutions established with the involvement of Michael Young

 Institute of Community Studies, 1954 (director 1954–2002, now part of the Young Foundation) 
 Consumers' Association, 1957 (chairman 1957–65, president 1965–93)
 Research Institute for Disabled Consumers, 1963 (chairman 1963) 
South African Committee for Higher Education, 1959 (founding sponsor)
 Botswana Extension College, 1959
 Lesotho Distance Teaching Centre, 1959
 Advisory Centre for Education, 1959
 Bethnal Green Exports Ltd., 1964–66
 Social Science Research Council, 1965 (chairman 1965–68)
 Thameside Research and Development Group, 1967–69
 National Consumer Council, 1975 (chairman 1975–77)
 National Extension College, 1962 (chairman 1962–71)
 Open University, 1964
 National Innovations Centre, 1968–74
 Institute for Social Studies in Medical Care, 1970–94
 International Extension College, 1971–2006
 Social Audit, 1972
 Mutual Aid Centre, 1977 (now part of the Young Foundation)
 Commuter Study Clubs, 1980
 International Alert, 1981
 University of the Third Age, 1982
 Tawney Society, 1982–88
 College of Health, 1983
 Association for the Social Study of Time, 1983
 Argo Venture, 1984–95
 Healthline, 1986
 Open College of the Arts, 1987 (chairman 1987–91)
 Centre for Electoral Choice, 1987
 Centre for Educational Choice, 1988
 LinkAge, 1988–95
 Samizdat, 1988–90
 Open School, 1989
 Language Line, 1990
 A Secondary Education Curriculum for Adults (ASECA), 1991 p35
 Adult Basic Education Programme (ABEP), 1991
 South African Institute of Distance Education (SAIDE), 1991
 Education Extra, 1992
 National Association for the Education of Sick Children, 1993
 Tower Hamlets Independent News Service (THINK), 1993–94
 National Funerals College, 1994
 Family Covenant Association, 1994
 The School for Social Entrepreneurs, 1997
 Phoenix Education Trust, 2001

Notes

References

Further reading

External links
 
 
 
 
 The Advisory Centre for Education (ACE)
 The Young Foundation – History
 The Young Foundation
 The Papers of Michael Young at the Churchill Archives Centre
The Papers of Sasha Moorsom Young at the Churchill Archives Centre
 The School for Social Entrepreneurs
 Phoenix Education Trust - About Us

1915 births
2002 deaths
Burials at Highgate Cemetery
Consumer rights activists
Young of Dartington
Alumni of the London School of Economics
Members of the Fabian Society
People associated with the Open University
People associated with Birkbeck, University of London
Fellows of Churchill College, Cambridge
British sociologists
People educated at Dartington Hall School
Social Democratic Party (UK) politicians
Social Democratic Party (UK) life peers
Social Democratic Party (UK, 1988) peers
Honorary Fellows of the British Academy
Life peers created by Elizabeth II